The Paradise Suite is a 2015 Dutch drama film directed by Joost van Ginkel. It was selected as the Dutch entry for the Best Foreign Language Film at the 88th Academy Awards but it was not nominated. It was screened in the Discovery section of the 2015 Toronto International Film Festival. It also won three Golden Calves for Best Film, Best Actor (Sawadogo) and Best Screenplay.

Plot
The film follows a number of people who, willingly or not, move to Amsterdam from abroad: three girls from Bulgaria who are told they will be models for a photo shoot, but end up in prostitution, the African man Yaya, who loses his job and gets in financial trouble, the Swedish musical conductor Stig, whose son Lukas goes missing, Serbian war criminal Ivica, who now runs a brothel in the Amsterdam red light district, and Seka from Bosnia, who recognises Ivica from her past. As the stories evolve, they merge into each other and these people, each with such different backgrounds, will have to rely on their new friendships.

Cast
 Isaka Sawadogo as Yaya
 Anjela Nedyalkova as Jenya
 Magnus Krepper as Stig
 Jasna Đuričić as Seka
 Erik Adelöw as Lukas
 Dragan Bakema as Milijan
 Raymond Thiry as Maarten
 Sigrid ten Napel as Antoinette
 Eva Röse as Julia Lindh Åberg
 Victoria Koblenko as Ana
 Jeroen Spitzenberger as Sven
 Reinout Bussemaker as Jack
 Babetida Sadjo as Angele
 Emmanuel Ohene Boafo as Mohammed

See also
 List of submissions to the 88th Academy Awards for Best Foreign Language Film
 List of Dutch submissions for the Academy Award for Best Foreign Language Film

References

External links
 

2015 films
2015 drama films
Dutch drama films
2010s Bulgarian-language films
2010s Dutch-language films
2010s Swedish-language films
2010s French-language films
Bosnian-language films
2010s Serbian-language films
Films about prostitution in the Netherlands
Films about human trafficking
Works about sex trafficking
2015 multilingual films
Dutch multilingual films